Monaco Telecom is the main telecommunications provider in the Principality of Monaco.

The following are some data about telecommunications in Monaco.

Telephones - main lines in use: 20 831 (2015)
Telephones - mobile cellular: 35 506 (2015)
Telephone system: automatic telephone system
domestic : NA

International
No satellite earth stations; connected by cable into the French communications system, however since June 1996, Monaco has had a separate country calling code, +377.

Radio and television
Radio broadcast stations: AM 1, FM 3, shortwave 8 (1998)
Radios: 34,000 (1997)
Television broadcast stations: 5 (1998)
Televisions: 13 829 (2015)

Internet
Internet service providers (ISPs) : Monaco Telecom (due to monopolistic situation of the unique provider)
Internet users: 18 096 users (December 2015)
5 connection levels : modem, DSL 512 kbit/s, ADSL 1024 kbit/s, ADSL 4096 kbit/s, DSL 15Mbit/s and VDSL 30 Mbit/s
Country code (Top level domain) : mc

Monaco
Economy of Monaco
Monaco